The Pittsburgh Steelers All-Time Team was named as a part of the franchise's 75th season celebration in . The team was chosen on the basis of fan voting.

The 50th season team  included only 24 players, all of whom are included on this team except guards Gerry Mullins and  Sam Davis, safety Mike Wagner and kickers  Roy Gerela  and Pat Brady.

The club announced the Steelers Legends team concurrently with this All-Time team. The Legends team compensates for the bias toward players who performed in the post-1970 era — it represents the best players in the franchise's pre-1970 history.

Offense

Defense

Specialists

Notes
Names in bold indicates the player spent his entire playing career with the Steelers.
Not yet eligible
Finalist in 2009, 2010 & 2011
Number retired by team
Finalist in 2002

References

Pittsburgh Steelers